Down Home may refer to:

Down Home (film), a 1920 silent film based on a book by Frank N. Westcott starring Leatrice Joy
Down Home (Zoot Sims album), 1960
Down Home (Chet Atkins album), 1962
Down Home (Sam Jones album), 1962
Down Home (Melba Montgomery album), 1964
Down Home (The Nashville String Band album), 1970
Down Home (Seals and Crofts album), 1970
Down Home (Joey Baron album), 1997
Down Home Records, a record label founded by Norman Granz
"Down Home" (Alabama song), a 1991 song by Alabama
"Down Home" (Jimmie Allen song), a 2022 song by Jimmie Allen
Down Home (TV series), an NBC sitcom